Dr. Jin is a 2012 South Korean historical television drama series, starring Song Seung-heon in the title role of Dr. Jin, a 21st-century neurosurgeon who travels back in time to the Joseon Dynasty. Also starring Park Min-young, Lee Beom-soo, Kim Jaejoong of JYJ, and Lee So-yeon, it aired on MBC from May 26 to August 12, 2012 on Saturdays and Sundays at 21:50 for 22 episodes.

Based on the Japanese manga series Jin written by Motoka Murakami, the series is the third television adaptation of the manga following the Japanese television drama JIN, starring Takao Osawa which aired on TBS in 2009 and its sequel in 2011. "Revamped with Korean sentiment," the setting was changed from the original's Edo period to the Joseon Dynasty, during the reign of King Cheoljong of Joseon, and real-life Japanese historical figure Sakamoto Ryōma was replaced with Joseon political figure Lee Ha-eung.

Plot
Jin Hyuk (Song Seung-heon) is a gifted neurosurgeon who was born into a family of doctors. His success rate in surgery hovers at 100%, with his ability to quickly analyze any situation and extremely steady hands. Due to his personal pursuit of perfection, he has a cold attitude and lacks compassion. He is planning to give his girlfriend Yoo Mi-na (Park Min-young) a ring as a gift from their mother when after an argument, Mi-na gets into a car accident and goes into a coma.

After surgically removing a foetus-shaped tumor from a patient's brain, a mysterious power causes Jin Hyuk to travel 150 years back in time to the year 1860 during the Joseon Dynasty, when medical technology was still in its infant stages. He begins treating people of the era, but the lack of necessary implements and rudimentary medical knowledge of the period forces him to develop medical devices and medicine by himself, and seek new ways to aid the sick. He meets young noblewoman Young-rae (who looks like Mi-na), who is betrothed to her childhood friend Kim Kyung-tak (Kim Jaejoong) but is not in love with him. Through this challenging process and with the help of Young-rae and Lee Ha-eung (Lee Beom-soo), Jin Hyuk becomes a true doctor. But his actions start interfering with history and Jin Hyuk is faced with hard choices.

Cast
 Song Seung-heon – Jin Hyuk
  
A 21st century doctor who finds himself trapped in the Joseon era following a tragic accident that puts his girlfriend, Yoo Mi-na, into a coma. After he arrives in Joseon, Jin met Hong Young-rae, a noblewoman who was an incarnation of his girlfriend.

 Park Min-young – Hong Young-rae (1860) / Yoo Mi-na (2012)

Hong Young-rae came from a noble family and she is a kindhearted woman who dreams of becoming a doctor after she meets Jin when he saves her rebel brother.

 Lee Beom-soo – Lee Ha-eung

A nobleman who becomes Jin's trusted friend. He is the future Heungseon Daewongun (Great Prince Regent, Father of King Gojong).

 Kim Jae-joong – Kim Kyung-tak

The illegitimate son of The Minister Kim and his concubine, he is a military officer who is in love with Hong Young-rae, the sister of his friend Young-hwi.

 Lee So-yeon – Choon-hong

A mysterious gisaeng. She fell in love with Jin when he saved her as child in the modern era, revealing that she is a time traveler herself. She is the girl with the Rubix Cube.

 Jin Yi-han – Hong Young-hwi

Young-rae's older brother and best friend to Kim Kyung-tak, he is an idealistic nobleman who leads the rebels. He later works with Ha-eung.

 Noeul – Yeon-shim, a gisaeng with Choon-hong  
 Kim Eung-soo – Minister Kim Byung-hee, nobleman and head of the powerful Andong Kim clan
 Kim Hye-ok – Young-rae's mother 
 Kim Il-woo – Yoo Hong-pil 
 Jung Eun-pyo – Heo Gwang, a Joseon doctor 
 Lee Seung-joon – Kwon Ik-joo 
 Lee Won-jong – Joo Pal, a local gangster 
 Kim Kwang-sik – Kkae Bok 
 Kim Myung-soo – Kim Dae-gyun, Kim Byung-hee's legitimate son and heir
 Kim Byung-choon
 Jang Young-nam as noblewoman Jo (guest appearance, ep 7–8)
 Jo Woo-jin as Deuk-chil

Production
The early working title was Time Slip Dr. Jin.

The series was filmed at MBC Dramia in Gyeonggi. This marked Song's return to television in 15 months since My Princess in 2011. It was also Kim Jaejoong's second drama since Protect the Boss in 2011, as well as his first historical drama. The series was initially planned for 20 episodes, but there were talks of an extension in July as reportedly both the production and actors felt that the 20 episodes were not enough to tell the full story. However this was strongly objected to by the actors' agencies citing low viewership ratings, the story's slow pace and future schedules.

Reception
According to AGB Nielsen Media Research, the first episode that aired on May 26, 2012 received a nationwide viewership rating of 12.2 percent, which was 1.9 percent behind its rival A Gentleman's Dignity on SBS.

Remark
Episode 21 wasn't aired on Saturday August 4 due to broadcast of the 2012 Summer Olympics in London, United Kingdom. This episode was aired on Sunday August 5, 2012.
Episode 22 wasn't aired on Saturday August 11 due to broadcast of the 2012 Summer Olympics in London, United Kingdom. This episode was aired on Sunday August 12, 2012.

Original soundtrack
 닥터진
 살아도 꿈인 것처럼 (Living Like a Dream) – Kim Jaejoong
 그대가 올까요 (Will You Come) – Zia
 눈물길 (Road of Tears) – Changmin, Seulong (2AM) 
 마지막 사랑 (Last Love) – Song Seung-heon
 연리지 (Now and Forever) – Ock Joo-hyun
 바람에 실려 (Saddle the Wind) – Lee Beom-soo
 눈물
 고뇌
 사랑
 인연
 바람에 실려 (inst)
 마지막 사랑 (inst)
 눈물길 (inst)
 그대가 올까요 (inst)
 살아도 꿈인 것처럼 (inst)

Awards
 2012 MBC Drama Awards: Best New Actor – Kim Jaejoong
 2013 Seoul International Drama Awards: Outstanding Korean Drama OST – "Living Like a Dream" by Kim Jaejoong

International broadcast
At the 18th Shanghai Television Festival in June 2012, the broadcast rights of the show were sold to Taiwan and Thailand.

 Taiwan: GTV – September 2012
 Singapore: Channel U – April 1, 2013
 Japan: DATV – May 25, 2013 onwards with Japanese subtitles for 22 episodes. However the relationship between the main characters of Jin Hyuk and Yoo Mi-na in the present (played by Song Seung-heon and Park Min-young respectively) was changed from lovers to siblings. Thus their love scenes were edited out, and to flesh out the sibling relationship, new scenes with child actors as well as narration by Song were added.
 Philippines: It aired on TeleAsia Chinese starting November 21, 2013, with the series dubbed in Hokkien Chinese. 
Thailand: It aired on 3SD starting February 15, 2015, with repeat on 3Family starting February 1, 2016.

See also
 Life on Mars, British miniseries with a similar premise.

References

External links
 Dr. Jin official MBC website 
 Dr. Jin at Kross Pictures 
 Dr. Jin at Victory Contents 
 Dr. Jin at MBC Global Media
 
 

2012 South Korean television series debuts
2012 South Korean television series endings
Korean-language television shows
South Korean time travel television series
MBC TV television dramas
Television series set in the Joseon dynasty
South Korean historical television series
South Korean medical television series
South Korean fantasy television series
South Korean television dramas based on manga
Television series by Victory Contents
Jin (manga)